Operation Dominic was a series of 31 nuclear test explosions with a  total yield conducted in 1962 by the United States in the Pacific. This test series was scheduled quickly, in order to respond in kind to the Soviet resumption of testing after the tacit 1958–1961 test moratorium. Most of these shots were conducted with free fall bombs dropped from B-52 bomber aircraft. Twenty of these shots were to test new weapons designs; six to test weapons effects; and several shots to confirm the reliability of existing weapons. The Thor missile was also used to lift warheads into near-space to conduct high-altitude nuclear explosion tests; these shots were collectively called Operation Fishbowl.

Operation Dominic occurred during a period of high Cold War tension between the United States and the Soviet Union, since the Cuban Bay of Pigs Invasion had occurred not long before. Nikita Khrushchev announced the end of a three-year moratorium on nuclear testing on 30 August 1961, and Soviet tests recommenced on 1 September, initiating a series of tests that included the detonation of Tsar Bomba. President John F. Kennedy responded by authorizing Operation Dominic. It was the largest nuclear weapons testing program ever conducted by the United States and the last atmospheric test series conducted by the U.S., as the Limited Test Ban Treaty was signed in Moscow the following year.

The operation was undertaken by Joint Task Force 8.

Shots

Sunset

The shot report lists the yield as  ±20% measured from a Bhangmeter and  ±10% from fireball analysis.

Full list of shots

Gallery

References

External links

 Joint Task Force 8 video report on Operation Dominic
 Operation Dominic at Carey Sublette's NuclearWeaponArchive.org
 More info on U.S. testing
 
 Operation Dominic at RECA UK (Radiation Exposure Compensation Act)

Explosions in 1962
Dominic
Exoatmospheric nuclear weapons testing
Johnston Atoll American nuclear explosive tests
Kiritimati
1962 in military history
1962 in Oceania
1962 in the environment
Dominic
Military projects of the United States